KUPU (channel 15) is an independent television station licensed to Waimanalo, Hawaii, United States, serving the Hawaiian Islands. Owned by Hawaii Catholic TV, the station maintains studios on Waimanu Street in downtown Honolulu; its two transmitter sites are located near Waimanalo Beach and at Mauna Kapu at the top of the Waianae mountain range.

History
The Federal Communications Commission (FCC) issued a construction permit to Waimanalo Television Partners on October 17, 2000, to build a full-service television station on UHF channel 56. The new station was given the call letters KMGT. The KMGT call letters were previously used on the TBN owned-and-operated station on channel 26. The station began operating on October 1, 2003, under a Program Test Authority and was officially licensed on June 18, 2004. In September 2006, Oceania Christian Church bought the station from Waimanalo Television Partners and the following month, changed the station's call letters from KMGT to KUPU, derived from the Hawaiian word for "to sprout".

Programming
The station previously aired both locally produced and nationally syndicated Catholic-oriented religious programming from CatholicTV, as well as programming from Vatican TV. In 2017, the station affiliated with the NBCUniversal-owned Cozi TV network. KUPU dropped its Cozi TV affiliation sometime in 2020 to return to airing religious programming; as of 2022, Cozi TV has not affiliated with another station in the Honolulu market.

Technical information

Subchannel

Analog-to-digital conversion
Because it was granted an original construction permit after the FCC finalized the DTV allotment plan on April 21, 1997 , the station did not receive a companion channel for a digital television signal. On January 15, 2009, KUPU shut down its analog signal, over UHF channel 15, on January 15, 2009, the date in which full-power television stations in Hawaii transitioned from analog to digital broadcasts (almost five months earlier than the June 12 transition date for stations on the U.S. mainland).

The station flash-cut its digital signal into operation on UHF channel 15; its former analog channel 56 was among the high band UHF channels (52-69) that were removed from broadcasting use and auctioned by the U.S. government for other uses as a result of the transition, using PSIP to display the station's virtual channel as its former UHF analog channel 56; although stations are required to use a PSIP virtual channel that corresponds with their analog channel allocation, KUPU later remapped to virtual channel 15, matching its physical digital signal.

References

Television channels and stations established in 2003
UPU
2003 establishments in Hawaii
Cozi TV affiliates